Kacha or KACHA may refer to:
Kacha, Sevastopol, an urban-type settlement under the jurisdiction of the city of Sevastopol on the Crimean Peninsula
 Kacha (air base), a Black Sea Fleet naval airbase
Kacha, Iran, a village in Gilan Province, Iran
Kacha, Russia, several rural localities in Russia
Kacha (sage), a mythological sage in Hinduism
Kacha (river), a river in Krasnoyarsk Krai, Russia
Kacha (king), c. 4th century Gupta king of India
2760 Kacha, a minor planet
Kāchā, alternative name of Kacha-ye Chahardeh, a village in Gilan Province, Iran
 Kaurna Aboriginal Community and Heritage Association (KACHA)
 Michael Kácha (1874–1940), Czech anarchist

See also
Kacha Bira, a woreda in the Southern Nations, Nationalities and Peoples' Region of Ethiopia
Kacchera or Kaccha, a type of loose undergarments